The Rochester Community Players (RCP), the oldest community theatre in New York State,   is a local theater group in Rochester, Monroe County, New York, in the United States.

Incorporated in 1923,  its first production, Wedding Bells, by playwright Salisbury Field,  opened January 19, 1925 at the German House on Rochester's Gregory Street.

Production History
The Rochester Community Players, Inc. has produced over 600 plays since 1925. For a list of productions, see Rochester Community Players production history.

The RCP Playhouse
Most of RCP's earliest productions were staged at the German House on Gregory Street, although one was staged at Rochester's old Lyceum Theater, built in 1903.  In 1926, RCP purchased the Playhouse, located at 820 South Clinton Avenue in Rochester. The Playhouse was built as a church, but had been used as a machine shop for the eight years prior to RCP's purchase.  The first RCP production at the Playhouse was Captain Applejack by Walter Hackett, opening November 1, 1926. The last RCP production at the Playhouse before it was sold in 1984 was Spoon River Anthology, by Edgar Lee Masters, which opened May 11, 1984.  RCP staged approximately 500 productions at the Playhouse.  From 1984 to 1992 RCP's productions were staged in an intimate cabaret style theatre housed in the Holiday Inn at 120 East Main Street.  In the fall of 1992 RCP moved to the Orcutt-Botsford Fine Arts Center (adjacent to St. John Fisher college)on East Avenue and remained there until 1995.  Since 1995 productions have been staged in many venues throughout the city of Rochester.

Background

Early years
For its first 50 years, RCP was considered the premiere theater in Rochester.   Early productions were not often dramatically challenging.  One reviewer, David L. George, theater critic for the Democrat and Chronicle from 1911 to 1956, described the 1931 production of Old Lady 31 by Rachel Crothers as "a type of play which is seldom written now, when novelty and frank treatment of sex themes are demanded by the paying patrons.  It is as wholesome as an old fashion, home made apple dumpling and as sweet as some of grandmother's best jam."  Another reviewer, Amy H. Croughton, described the same play as "an out-moded, lavender and old lace sort of thing heavily loaded with sentimentality and deriving its comedy chiefly from charicture and exaggeration."

Theater quality appears to have risen after World War II.  Perhaps RCP's strongest season was 1958–59,  when RCP produced Guys and Dolls; Inherit the Wind; Visit to a Small Planet by Gore Vidal; Blithe Spirit featuring Foster Brooks; and As You Like It by William Shakespeare.  12 year old Mimi Kennedy appeared in The Spider Web, by Agatha Christie, in October 1960.  At that time RCP also launched the careers of professional actors Robert Forster and Jerry Vogel.  From the 1960s forward RCP has staged a variety of challenging works including; dramas, comedies, musicals and the classics.

1970s on
By the early 1970s RCP receded as other community theater organizations in Rochester began producing and attracting significant audiences.  A regional equity professional theater, Geva Theatre Center was founded in 1972, and over a period of years the prominent community members who would have been members of the RCP Board in an earlier era were drawn to Geva instead.  The Playhouse itself deteriorated over time and was abandoned as a performance space from 1976 to 1980 when productions were staged at various venues including Monroe Community College.  A brief return to the Playhouse took place between 1980 and 1984.  From 1984 to 1992 RCP staged its productions at the Holiday Inn Downtown (the hotel is now known as the Radisson Hotel, and is located at 120 East Main Street, Rochester.) RCP has operated out of various temporary venues since then.  Through the summer of 2012 RCP has produced close to 700 full theatrical productions and has operated continuously for 88 seasons. RCP claims to be the second oldest continuously operating community theater in the United States, but the organization is unaware of any entity which has systematically collected such information so the claim cannot be verified.

Managing directors
In 1926, RCP hired its own full-time professional director and manager, Robert Stevens of New York City.  RCP was said to be the first community theater in the United States to hire a full-time director.  He was "engaged" for three weeks and stayed for 28 years, operating RCP until his retirement in 1953.   He was assisted for many years by scenic designer Milton Robinson, who retired in 1951.  Stevens was succeeded by George Warren and Harriet Warren.   For nearly 20 years, starting with the 1953–54 season, Mr. Warren acted as RCP's business manager and Mrs. Warren as the artistic director.  Over the following years, they were assisted by several set designers including Barry Tuttle, who produced Town and Country Summer Theater for many seasons in East Rochester, William Andia, who joined RCP's 20th season when he was 15, learned his theater craft and came back in 1960 to fill an emergency vacancy then stayed for three years more, and Betsy Hall, who worked as scenic designer from 1953 to 1976.  Mr. Tom Vawter also acted as scenic designer/T.D. from 1976 until the mid-1980s.  The Warrens came to Rochester in 1953 after 17 years of developing community theater in Jamestown, New York.  Their goal was to transform the socially elite image of RCP and hoped RCP would go professional, as had Buffalo's Studio Arena Theater, which had started as a community theater in 1927 and converted into a professional theater in 1965.  However, RCP remained a community theater during the Warren years.  George Warren died March 11, 1972, and Hattie Warren retired the next year.  Various full-time and part-time managers operated the theater over the next 25 years. The longest period being from 1987 to 1998 when Michael C. Krickmire held the full-time position of Producing/Artistic Director of RCP.   RCP has been managed entirely by volunteers since 1998. The Immediate Past President of RCP is Peter Scribner.  The current President of RCP is Michael C. Krickmire.

Acting companies

Shakespeare Program
In 1994, RCP established the Shakespeare Players,  a free Shakespeare program performing in the auditorium of the New Life Presbyterian Church.  Since 1997, RCP's Shakespeare Players have performed an annual free Shakespeare in the Park production of one of William Shakespeare's plays in early July at the Highland Park Bowl. The Shakespeare at the Bowl production is co-sponsored by the Monroe County, New York Parks Department. In 2010, the Shakespeare Players program began producing Shakespeare plays indoors at MuCCC, the Multiple-use Community Cultural Center, 142 Atlantic Avenue, Rochester NY.

Irish Program
In 1997 RCP established The Irish Players of Rochester,  a program that produces Irish theatre. Plays are performed at MuCCC. The Irish Players program is a member of the Acting Irish International Theatre Festival and has participated in each festival since 2003.

References

External links
 Highland Park Bowl (home of RCP's Shakespeare at the Bowl): 
 Picture of the old Lyceum Theater: 

Theatre companies in New York (state)
Culture of Rochester, New York